Personio is a German software company headquartered in Munich. The company develops software that simplifies or automates HR management processes for smaller companies. As a business-to-business (B2B) company, Personio had more than 6,000 customers in Germany and other countries as of 2022, most of which were small and medium-sized enterprises. With a valuation of $8.5 billion, Personio was one of the most valuable unicorns in Germany. With around 2100 employees in it

History 
Personio was founded in 2015 by Hanno Renner, Ignaz Forstmeier, Roman Schumacher and Arseniy Vershinin, all of whom had studied at the Technical University of Munich. The company emerged from a program of the Center for Digital Technology and Management. The cloud-based software was primarily used by other start-up companies in the early days, and was thus able to cover a market niche. Personio's software is provided for a subscription payment and can simplify or completely automate processes in the area of human resource management.

In October 2021, Personio announced a new round of financing in the amount of $230 million. Investors included various venture capitalists from the United States such as Greenoaks Capital Partners, Altimeter and Alkeon Capital. In June 2022, Personio announced another series E funding round of $250 million.

References 

German companies established in 2015
Companies based in Munich
Software companies established in 2015
Software companies of Germany